Rosa lucieae (syn.  Rosa wichurana), the memorial rose, is a species of rose native to eastern Asia.

Description
It is a woody, semi-evergreen shrub, with long trailing thorny branches of glossy green leaves, and single five-petalled white flowers with prominent yellow stamens in Summer; followed by small dark red hips. It is named after the German botanist Max Ernst Wichura (1817–1866), with the suffix -iana.

Uses
While it is valued as a garden plant in its own right, R. lucieae is also a parent of several rose hybrids, notably 'Dorothy Perkins', 'Albéric Barbier', 'New Dawn' and 'Albertine'. Its vigorous, rambling habit makes it particularly suitable for forming an impenetrable barrier at ground level, or for scrambling up large trees. It has been introduced to the United States.

Gallery

References

lucieae
Flora of Southeast China
Flora of Eastern Asia
Flora of the Philippines
Plants described in 1886
Taxa named by François Crépin